Panevėžys (Latin: Panevezen; ; , Ponevezh; see also other names) is the fifth largest city in Lithuania. As of 2011, it occupied  with 113,653 inhabitants. As defined by Eurostat, the population of Panevėžys functional urban area, that stretches beyond the city limits, is estimated at 127,471 (as of 2017)

The largest multifunctional arena in Panevėžys, Cido Arena, hosted the Eurobasket 2011 group matches.

The city is still widely known, if indirectly, in the Jewish world, for the eponymous Ponevezh Yeshiva.

Coat of arms

Historical facts allow to state that the first seal of the city of Panevėžys appeared when the city self-government was established. It is clear that until the end of the 18th century, Panevėžys did not have the right of self-government, therefore it could not had its coat of arms. All the preconditions for the establishment of self-government arose during the period of the Four-year Seimas (1788–1792). In 1791–1792, most of the county centers, which previously did not have self-government rights and coat of arms, established them.

The coat of arms of Panevėžys, as well as other Lithuanian counties, has been changed, modified and banned several times over the past 200 years. There are 3 types of Panevėžys city seals, which were used in the early 19th century. The first appeared in 1801, the second was put into use in 1812, and the third in 1817. There is no doubt that all three seals under the double-headed eagle of the Russian Empire, which should have emphasized the city's affiliation with this state, depicted the old coat of arms of Panevėžys – a brick or stone building with three towers, later a brick gate with three towers and a powerful tower behind them with a Cyrillic letter P (П) on the roof – the first letter of the city.

After the Uprising of 1831, the old symbolism was erased from the seals of the county centers. Instead, a double-headed eagle prevailed in them unilaterally. It was only in 1845 that Emperor Nicholas I confirmed with his own hand the new coat of arms of Panevėžys County, at the top of which a silver obelisk was depicted in a blue field and a brown žagrė with a steel plowshare in the silver field at the bottom; the base of the shield was green-brown.

With the outbreak of World War I and the collapse of Russian oppression, most Lithuanian cities removed the symbols established by the Russian Empire and had returned to their historical coats of arms. At the beginning of the 1920s, two symbols were used in the coat of arms of Panevėžys in one field of a shield shape. At the top – two tied plant bundles, below them – a plough.

The use of city coats of arms resumed in the post-war years only in 1966, when the Republican Heraldry Commission was established under the Ministry of Culture. The standard of the coat of arms of Panevėžys was proposed to be made by the artist Arvydas Každailis. Thus another version of the coat of arms of the city of Panevėžys appeared: two crossed white bundles of linen were depicted in the upper red field, and a white stylized plough in the lower blue field. Later, after adjusting the colors, it was decided to leave this coat of arms to the Panevėžys District Municipality.

The current coat of arms of the city of Panevėžys has been created taking into account the international practice of restoration of the historical coats of arms of the cities and the requirements of heraldry. The oldest coat of arms of the city was chosen to restore the coat of arms. The 1812 iconography of the seal was used as the best heraldically arranged on which a two-storey gates with an entrance opening on the first floor and two windows on the second floors are depicted. Above the gate – three towers, behind them, in the middle – a powerful tower.

As the historical colors of the coat of arms are unknown, it was decided to use the most common colors and metals in the heraldry of Lithuanian cities: silver (white), red, and as auxiliary – black. The current coat of arms of Panevėžys is a red brick building in the silver panel field, symbolizing the city gate. The coat of arms of Panevėžys was approved by a presidential decree on 11 May 1993. The author of the current coat of arms of the city standard is Arvydas Každailis.

History

Grand Duchy of Lithuania 

Legend has it that Grand Duke of Lithuania Vytautas the Great, returning from Samogitia to Vilnius in 1414, found a temple (alka) of the old Lithuanian religion in the present-day surroundings of Panevėžys, but this has not been documented.

Another myth among the locals, was also that when Anna - wife of Vytautas the Great, was refreshing herself in the river of Nevėžis, and her personal servant got startled by crayfish in river waters (crayfish in lithuanian is Vėžys) - and yelled "Pani, viažys" so Anna would be careful. This was not documented, but is well known story among people from local areas.

Panevėžys was first mentioned evidently on 7 September 1503 in documents signed by the Grand Duke Alexander Jagiellon, who granted the town building rights to construct a church and other structures. Alexander Jagiellon is considered as the founder of the city, which celebrated its 500th anniversary in 2003; two renowned monuments were built in the city for this anniversary, one of which is dedicated to Alexander Jagiellon. The city lies on the old plain of the river Nevėžis and the city name means "along the Nevėžis." Panevėžys Mound with a flat top and 1.5 – 2 meters high embankments previously stood at the confluence of river Nevėžis and stream Sirupis (destroyed in the 19th – 20th centuries). Throughout the 16th century, the city maintained a status of a Royal town. Communities of Poles inhabit the area from the 13th century, and Karaites, settled in the area as early as the 14th century. A Karaite Kenesa, and a Polish Gymnasium, existed in Panevėžys until the Second World War (the Polish version of the name of the city was ). In the 16th century, the part of the city on the left bank of the river started to develop and expand further. In 1727, the Piarists, who moved to the western part of Panevėžys, built a Church of the Holy Trinity, established a monastery and a college. In 1791, Panevėžys was granted a conditional privilege to elect the city government.

19th – early 20th centuries 

Following the Third Partition of the Polish–Lithuanian Commonwealth in 1795, the city was assigned to the Vilna Governorate. In 1800, Panevėžys received a permission to build a town hall. In 1825, the Evangelical Lutheran Church was built in Panevėžys, and the Orthodox parish was founded in 1841. The city played an important role in both the November Uprising, and the January Uprising, and the fights for independence continued there after 1864. In 1843, Panevėžys was assigned to the Kovno Governorate and in 1866 the town hall was replaced with a City Duma. Panevėžys Teachers' Seminary was the first education institution in the Russian Empire in which the teaching of the Lithuanian language was officially started.

Following the Industrial Revolution, at the end of the 19th century, the first factories were established in the city, and industry began to make use of modern machinery. As products were oriented towards the mass market, banking intensified and commerce increased. The educational system became more accessible, and literacy increased, as well. By the end of 19th century - the beginning of the 20th century, Panevėžys became a strong economic and cultural center of the region. At the time it was the fourth most important city in Lithuania (excluding Klaipėda).

Panevėžys also was a center of operations by local knygnešiai (book smugglers). In 1880, Naftalis Feigenzonas established the first printing house in Panevėžys. At the end of the book prohibition, one of the Lithuanian book smugglers – Juozas Masiulis – in 1905 opened the first Lithuanian bookstore and printing house. The building is still a landmark of Panevėžys, and local people are proud of this heritage, symbolized in a bookstore that has been functional for more than 100 years.

1918–1941 

Volunteers of the Lithuanian Armed Forces had liberated the city for the first time from the Bolsheviks' forces on 27 March 1919 during the Lithuanian Wars of Independence and raised flags of Lithuania. Between the World Wars, in the newly independent Lithuania, Panevėžys continued to grow.

The Ponevezh Yeshiva, one of the most notable Haredi yeshivas in the history of the Jews in Lithuania, was established and flourished in the town. Rabbi Yosef Shlomo Kahaneman (1886–1969) was its rosh yeshiva (head) and president. Known as the "Ponovezher Rov", he was also the leading rabbi of Panevėžys. He managed to escape to the British Mandate of Palestine where he set about rebuilding the Ponevezh Yeshiva in Bnei Brak where it still exists in modern Israel. It has a very large student body of young Talmud scholars.

The town's population rose to 26,200 between 1923 and 1939. On 15 June 1940, Red Army military forces took over the city, as a consequence of the forced incorporation of Lithuania into the Soviet Union. A number of political prisoners were murdered near the sugar factory. A large number of residents were exiled to Siberia (merely during the June deportation in 1941 over 600 residents were exiled to Siberia) or suffered other forms of political repression.

On 23 June 1941, the June Uprising began in Panevėžys County. The most active participants of the uprising were in Ramygala and Krekenava counties. The participants of the uprising were also active in the city of Panevėžys. On 25 June 1941, the Panevėžys Staff of the June Uprising was established in the city which was headed by Lieutenant Colonel Antanas Stapulionis. One of the staff's tasks was to oversee the order in the city, thus Antanas Stapulionis had issued an order stating that the robbers will be shot on the spot, and ordered to remove all signs which reminisced the Soviet rule. Moreover, the scouts were sent to all roads leading from the city and on 25 June, at the initiative of the rebels, the Piniavos Bridge and the food factory  were demined. The Panevėžys Post Office was peacefully passed into the hands of the rebels. During the first days of the war, the NKGB units carried out repressions, arrested participants of the June Uprising and civilians who spoke out against the Soviet government; the detainees were transported to the Panevėžys Prison. As the Germans were approaching, seeing no way out, the Soviets had decided to retreat to the East and to shoot the political prisoners in the prison. Already on 27 June, the city was full of the Lithuanian Tricolor flags and without any serious clashes with the retreating Red Army in the city or its surroundings. Furthermore, on 27 June, the Wehrmacht had entered Panevėžys and in the end of June the Germans liquidated the staff of the rebels.

Soviet and Nazi annexations 

After Germany attacked the USSR, Panevėžys was occupied by German forces, as it had been during the First World War. It acquired the status of a district center within the Reichskommissariat Ostland. During the Nazi occupation nearly all the Jewish population of the town was killed in 1943 during the Holocaust; only a few managed to escape and find asylum abroad. The major massacre was in August 1941 when 7,523 Jews were executed by the German Army officers and soldiers, German-SS officers and the Panevėžys (10th) police battalion.

In 1944 the city was yet again occupied by the Soviet Union leading to a new wave of political exiles and killings. The Lithuanian partisans of the Vytis military district actively operated in the Panevėžys County from 1944 and militarily confronted with the Soviet forces in notable battles, however following the death of chief Bronius Karbočius in 1953 the staff of the Vytis military district was not restored and the last partisans were killed in action in 1956.

After World War II, the natural process of the city's evolution was disrupted. The Soviet Communist Party exercised dictatorial control and the city was transformed into a major industrial center. During the 1960s and 1980s, several large-scale industrial companies were established. The Soviet authorities also partly destroyed the old town and only after protests by local population was total destruction of the old city center stopped.

The number of inhabitants increased from 41,000 to 101,500 between 1959 and 1979.

Independent Lithuania 
In 1990, the population reached 130,000. After Lithuania regained its independence, the city's industry faced some major challenges. For some time it was regarded as a place where plastics cooperatives were making large profits. After independence, the population of Panevėžys fell somewhat and for a while most investments went to Vilnius or Klaipėda instead. However, with the economic growth in the early 2000s, investment also reached Panevėžys. Babilonas real estate project, the largest such project in the Baltic States with an 80 ha land area, has been developed in Panevėžys since 2004.

Panevėžys Free Economic Zone was established in 2013.

Geography
Panevėžys is situated in the middle of Lithuania; it is halfway between two Baltic capitals - Vilnius and Riga. The good geographical location with good road infrastructure, and the international highway Via Baltica provides opportunities for business. The city is connected by railway to Šiauliai (Lithuania) and Daugavpils (Latvia), as well as with Rubikiai/Anykščiai by the Aukštaitijos narrow gauge railway. This railway is preserved as a historical monument and serves as a tourist attraction.  east of Panevėžys the Panevėžys Air Base is located.

Cityscape

Urbanism and architecture

16th – 18th centuries 

Old Panevėžys started to develop at the beginning of the 16th century on the right bank of Nevėžis when Grand Duke Alexander Jagiellon separated the lands from the state manor for the Parish of Ramygala, currently this part of Panevėžys is located in the Senamiesčio Street. Soon, in a more convenient place, on the land of the Grand Duke's manor on the left bank of the Nevėžis, near the important roads to Ramygala and Upytė, New Panevėžys began to develop (the current city center). Following the Volok Reform at the end of the 16th century, New Panevėžys separated from the manor and became a separate territorial unit. Between the Old and the New Town stood the Panevėžys Manor, thus the different dependence of these parts of the city (to the state, the church, and the private nobleman) prevented Panevėžys from developing evenly. As a result, no prominent architectural ensembles and dominant compositions were formed, also there were no public buildings that stood out in terms of size or artistic expression. The city consisted of single-storey wooden buildings, a wooden church, and a small, inexpressive manor house. The only surviving heritage of that period in the city is the Renaissance style building of the Upytė County Court and the network of streets.

The city was severely damaged during the war with Moscow in 1654–1667 and the Great Northern War of 1700–1721, thus only 18 families lived in Old Panevėžys in 1720 and 90 families in New Panevėžys in 1738. In the second half of the 18th century, Panevėžys, like many other small cities affected by the wars, consisted almost exclusively of wooden one-storey houses. In 1727, on the western side of the New Panevėžys Square, the construction of the ensemble of the Piarists Monastery was started: the monastery building, the church and the college (to be rebuilt after the fire of 1790 with a Classicist style stone masonry church). New buildings and the wooden synagogue built in 1794 did not change the city plan, but highlighted the city center, which had no striking accents in terms of size and spatial composition. Of these buildings, only the church has survived to this day, while others were damaged during the World War II and were demolished in the post-war years. The houses around the city's square highlighted its space, while the part of the city beyond the river (Old Panevėžys) had a typical rural view.

In the 1780s, there were two independent uniform radial-plan urban complexes separated by a forest: the town of New Panevėžys and the town of Old Panevėžys. In 1780, after the burning of the wooden church of Old Panevėžys, it was rebuilt not in the previous place, but in the pine forest of the Nevėžis loop, between both parts of Panevėžys. After cutting down the forest around the church, a new town was built next to it, according to the traditional rectangular plan and the planned square, which under the tsar's administration in the 19th century was named Nikolaev (called as Smėlynė by the local folks). In 1781, Old Panevėžys had 2 streets and 21 homestead, while in 1788 in New Panevėžys there were 144 plots near 8 streets. The longest in this part of Panevėžys was Ramygalos Street, which was divided into two branches at the northern end and between them was a triangular market square. At the end of the 18th century, a mixed plan of Panevėžys was forming: it consisted of three parts of different sizes and different stages of development. The entire structure was dominated by New Panevėžys in which the Piarists Monastery with a Classicist style towerless stone church was rebuilt after the fire of 1790.

19th – early 20th centuries 

Since the early 19th century, New Panevėžys grew faster and by the middle of the century its territory spread mostly to the west, less to the east, and with other parts of the city – Old Panevėžys and especially the grown-up Smėlynė (which had 7 streets and a square in 1856) – had already formed a single complex. As the territory grew more slowly than the population, the buildings were mostly built in the central part of New Panevėžys, where densely built-up quarters were formed. After 1825 the Evangelical Lutheran Church was built in the city (it was rebuilt in 1845), while in 1830 the county's treasury, in 1837 – a prison, after 1840 – a hospital and after 1842 – a boyar's school were built. The significance of the Piarists Monastery increased, however it was closed after the Uprising of 1831 and the monks' corps was turned into a military barracks, while the Catholic church was remade into an Eastern Orthodox church. There were a number of brick buildings in New Panevėžys, some of them in the Classicist style and brick buildings began to dominate in the city center. However, unlike in most Lithuanian cities, Panevėžys spread over a rather large area on both sides of Nevėžis and lacked buildings which would have formed its silhouette and highlighted the panorama of the city in the landscape of plains. In 1877–1885, the St. Peter and St. Paul's Church of Romanesque Revival style with two tall towers was built instead of a wooden church, which began to dominate in the city's silhouette. In 1878, a planning project for the city of Panevėžys was prepared in which new quarters were planned in the northern and southern parts of the city as an organic continuation of the already established plan (12 new quarters were added to the existing 49 quarters). Since 1873, the growth of the city was also influenced by the completed railway track between Radviliškis and Daugavpils; the railway and station soon grew into the fabric of an expanding city.

Other notable buildings from the 19th century and early 20th century are two windmills in Ramygalos Street (built in 1875 and 1880), historicism brick style Panevėžys bottling plant of the state vodka monopoly in Kranto Street (built in 1880; served as a Panevėžys Cannery during the Soviet period), building of the current Juozas Balčikonis Gymnasium (1884), residential house of J. Kasperovičius (1889; served as a court during the interwar period, later as a Local Lore Museum during the Soviet period and currently is the Panevėžys City Art Gallery), historicism brick style prison buildings – a two-story administrative building near the street and a four-story prison building in the courtyard (1893; P. Puzino St. 12), eclectic two-storey hotel Centralinis with mezzanine and attic (1894; Laisvės Square 1), Moigių houses complex of pink and yellow brick masonry (1895; now Panevėžys Museum of Local Lore), historicism style yeast and distillery factory buildings (Respublikos St. 82), historicism style two-storey J. Masiulis Bookstore (1890–1900), Natelis Kisinas' house (1900; in 1987 it was integrated into the Panevėžys City Municipality building complex), neoclassical with Art Nouveau style features Panevėžys Credit Society Palace (1915; now Panevėžys County Gabrielė Petkevičaitė-Bitė Public Library).

Interwar period 

During the World War I around 100 buildings were damaged or destroyed in Panevėžys. Following the Lithuanian Wars of Independence, Panevėžys began to recover: city's bridges were renovated (1925), streets were paved, a power plant was built (1923). During the interwar period, a number of public and residential buildings and industrial buildings were built in the city, and a precise geodetic plan of the city was prepared – one of the first such works in Lithuania (1933–1934; engineers M. Ratautas, A. Kočegūra, P. Butrimas). In the 1930s, the construction of the sewerage system was started, the bed of the Nevėžis was adjusted, and Laisvės Square was renewed. In the early 1920s, the city lacked funds, thus the first slightly more significant building was a modest one-storey primary school with an attic at the intersection of Marija (now A. Smetona) and Klaipėdos streets, built in 1923; in the same year a wooden Panevėžys County Hospital was built.

Since the end of the 1920s, much more significant buildings have been built. In 1928, the Jewish Gymnasium from yellowish bricks was built in Elektros Street in the style of historicism (now serves as the Panevėžys Regional Court), which was called as a palace due to its splendid exterior decoration and installed heating and water supply systems. In 1930, the Panevėžys Cathedral of Neo-Baroque style forms was consecrated by Jonas Mačiulis-Maironis. In the 1930s, instead of historicism, the style of Lithuanian modernism began to prevail: building of the Panevėžys branch of the Bank of Lithuania (1931), Panevėžys State Girls' Gymnasium in Smėlynės Street (1932; architect Vytautas Landsbergis-Žemkalnis), Panevėžys District Municipality Building (1933), Jewish People's Bank building in Respublikos Street (1933; now restaurant Nendrė vėjyje), Panevėžys City Primary School No. 3 in Ukmergės Street (1935), Panevėžys Regional Health Insurance Fund Building (1937), primary school in Danutės Street (1938; now Panevėžys 5th Gymnasium), a two-storey Panevėžys Farmers Small Credit Bank Building in Laisvės Square (1938), Panevėžys St. Chapel of the Immaculate Conception of the Virgin Mary in Marijonų Street (1939), three-storey primary school no. 2 in Maironio Street (1940; now Panevėžys Raimundas Sargūnas Sports Gymnasium), a four-storey building for the Seminary of Priests of the Panevėžys Diocese (now Panevėžys Kazimieras Paltarokas Gymnasium), Panevėžys County Municipal Palace (1940). Cheap wooden construction was more popular for residential housing, thus houses in Panevėžys were also much cheaper (~9,000 LTL) than in Kaunas (~30,000 LTL) and Šiauliai (~19,000 LTL).

Middle – late 20th century 

During the World War II, Panevėžys was damaged quite severely again. After the war, part of the historic buildings were reconstructed, and large-scale buildings that did not correspond to the historical scale appeared in the destroyed places and empty spaces. The mostly damaged part of Panevėžys was a quarter between Ukmergė and Elektros streets, which has long been inhabited by the poor Jews (so-called Slobodka); at the end of the 1960s many brick apartment buildings were built in this quarter along with the Juozas Miltinis Drama Theatre (1967–1968).

Industrial enterprises were renovated in the post-war years, three-storey blocks of flats were built in empty places in the city center and near the center in Kranto, Ukmergės, N. Gogolio (now Smėlynės), Ramygalos, Klaipėdos, Agronomijos (now Marijonų), Sandėlių (now S. Kerbedžio) streets, Liepų Avenue, and two-storey houses in Margių, Algirdo, Stoties streets. During the Soviet era, Panevėžys was developed as an industrial center. According to the 1961 master plan, two industrial districts were formed: the city's northwest and northeast. In the sixties and seventies, large industrial companies were built: Lietkabelis, reinforced concrete products, precision mechanics, autocompressors, Ekranas factory, glass factory.

Consequently, the city grew rapidly as residents from the surrounding villages and other districts moved to Panevėžys and construction of apartment districts has begun. The first quarters of 4-5 storey brick houses were built in P. Rotomskio (now Marijonų), Vilnius, J. Basanavičius streets, while since 1965 large-scale prefabricated houses were built, mainly five-storey (so-called khrushchyovkas). The characteristic features of the buildings built in the 1970s and 1980s are the ignorance of the architectural environment, the use of strict, ascetic forms, the abandonment of aesthetic architectural goals, turning them into styless buildings. The multi-apartment houses built in the city center based on repeated projects diminished and leveled the general urban character of the center.

Last decade of the 20th century – 21st century 

In the first years of the re-established Independent Lithuania, huge residential houses of several hundred square meters with no architectural value began to sprout on the outskirts of the city. No major constructions took place: the development of Kniaudiškės multi-apartment district stopped, the construction of public buildings decreased and with the closure of many industries, their buildings have been abandoned and demolished, however many buildings were also adapted by modern companies in the later years and Panevėžys continues to be referred as an industrial city. With the construction of large supermarkets on the western outskirts of the city, a shopping district was formed. Individual houses predominated in the construction of residential houses, with most houses being built in the nearest northern and southern suburbs of Panevėžys. New apartment buildings were built in Ramygala, Margiai, Klaipėda-Projektuotojų, Suvalkų, Pušaloto streets.

Bridges 

The first bridge over river Nevėžis was built in the 17th century between Old and New Panevėžys. The description of Kovno Governorate mentions a 128 meters long bridge on poles. In the interwar period, the city had two reinforced concrete bridges and three wooden bridges, which the city municipality were removing in the winters to prevent them from being carried away by ice. Both reinforced concrete bridges, named as Laisvės and Respublikos, were built in the 1930s. The decks of the Respublikos Bridge were blown up during the World War II, thus it was reconstructed in 1968. The Laisvės Bridge (located in the current Smėlynės Street) with huge arches became too narrow as traffic flows increased, thus it was demolished in 1964 and was replaced by a new uncut system beam reinforced concrete three-span bridge.

During the Soviet era, as the city grew, more bridges were built: the Nemunas Street Bridge (1976), the Ekranas Bridge on J. Biliūno Street (Nevėžis Dam, 1979). The bridge of Savitiškio (now – Vakarinės) Street was built a little earlier, first it was wooden, later it was rebuilt from a reinforced concrete. In the 2000s, the Panevėžys Bypass Bridge was built on the western outskirts of the city (reconstructed in 2019). The city also has three pedestrian bridges across river Nevėžis: at Skaistakalnis, near the Palace of Communities, and in the Culture and Recreation Park (1984, reconstructed in 2015).

In the north-east of Panevėžys, above Senamiesčio Street and the wide railway, a narrow-gauge railway viaduct was built in 1938, which is enlisted in the Register of Cultural Values of the Republic of Lithuania.

Parks and squares 

The main green spaces of Panevėžys are located in the Nevėžis Valley along the river Nevėžis. Parks and greenery in the city occupy about 700 hectares or 14% of the total area of Panevėžys. The area of greenery per one resident of Panevėžys is almost three times larger than the norm defined by legal acts (25 m²). The largest recreational area in the city is the 39 hectares Culture and Recreation Park. The area of the oldest Skaistakalnis Park – 29.74 hectares, Youth Park – 4.14 hectares. In the west of the city, it is planned to install another, Kniaudiškės Park, the area of which will reach 7.7 hectares.

Other important green areas in the city are Senvagė, Palace of Communities, January 13, Remembrance, Povilas Plechavičius squares, A. Baranauskas Park. As well as the greenery of Freedom, Independence, and Volunteers squares. Over 6 million euros were invested in renovation of the Freedom Square in 2017–2021. The Independence Square also was renovated with 1.9 million euros investment in 2017–2021.

In 1934–1936, A. Jakštas Avenue was established with cement bricks pavement on the right bank of river Nevėžis. Planted with acacias, it became one of the most beautiful places in Panevėžys in a few years, and was called the Love Avenue by the townspeople. The A. Jakštas Street was newly reconstructed in 2018–2020 for 1.7 million euros.

The main recreational water body of the city is Ekranas Lagoon with place for launching boats, pontoon jetty with place for lowering and raising kayaks, mooring berth, as well as pedestrian and bike paths, recreation and entertainment areas near it.

Religion 

According to the religious groups census of 2011, 250,390 residents of the Panevėžys County indicated their religion as: 203,375 – Roman Catholic, 2,525 – Orthodox, 1,787 – Old Believers, 437 – Evangelical Lutheran, 3,091 – Evangelical Reformed, 62 – Sunni Islam, 15 – Judaism, 36 – Greek Catholic, 29 – Karaite Judaism, other – 1,228, irreligious – 16,138, did not specify – 21,667.

In 1507, the first Panevėžys church was built on the right bank of river Nevėžis – a Panevėžys Old Town filial church, belonging to the Ramygala Parish. The church was small, wooden, covered with boards, with a tower and 3 bells, had 3 altars. Near the church there was a rectory and outbuildings, a tavern, a sauna and a brewery. In 1528, it was decided to establish a parish school. An independent Panevėžys Parish was established in 1568. In 1629–1631, pastor Jurgis Tiškevičius built a new wooden church. In 1636, Grand Duke Władysław IV Vasa built the Chapel of Saint Casimir of the Vilnius Cathedral and assigned to it manors of the Panevėžys Old Town and Ramygala. Since then, the pastors of Panevėžys and Ramygala have been the pastors of St. Casimir's Chapel, and in Panevėžys and Ramygala there were only their vicars. In 1655, during the Russo-Polish War (1654–1667), the church was greatly damaged: its floors, windows, altars were broken, paintings were stolen, moreover, soon the church was turned into military barracks and slightly later – a hospital. In 1781, the canon of Vilnius Chapter Mikalojus Tiškevičius built a new wooden church on the right bank of river Nevėžis, near New Panevėžys, to which he moved the parish from Old Panevėžys. In 1877–1885, by the care of the pastor Mykolas Chodoravičius, the current St. Peter and St. Paul's Church was built from bricks. Catholic priests of the city (e.g. Kaziemiras Paltarokas, Felicijonas Lelis, Jonas Karbauskas, Jonas Balvočius) were active book smugglers during the Lithuanian press ban.

Monks of the Congregation of Marian Fathers of the Immaculate Conception moved to Panevėžys in 1927 and settled close to the Church of the Holy Trinity; on 15 August 1915 the newly built Marian Chapel was consecrated.

Panevėžys is the seat of the Roman Catholic Diocese of Panevėžys, which was established in 1926. Its primary church is the Christ the King Cathedral, consecrated in 1933.

Panevėžys has a rich history of Lithuanian Jews. In 1875, Panevėžys had eight synagogues, possibly the amount of the prayer communities was the same. The smaller synagogues were also called houses of prayer or a religious school – they served both functions of these institutions. The houses of prayer could have also been set up in private houses. The prayer community was led by a council consisting of an elder, a teacher, a treasurer, and a rabbi, and took care of the management of synagogues and prayer schools and the organization of charity. After Telšiai, Panevėžys was known as the most significant center of Torah studies. As early as 1897, the Jewish community in the city had one main synagogue, later numbered 8, 7, 12, and perhaps 15 houses of worship, however only small fragments of these buildings have survived to this day. The most important wooden synagogue, built in 1764 or 1794, stood in the area between Elektros and Ukmergės streets, but it burned down at the end of the World War I. Seventeen Jewish houses of worship have already been mentioned in the interwar city. The Jewish population of the city was nearly completely exterminated during the German occupation of Lithuania during World War II.

The Panevėžys Evangelical Lutheran Parish was founded in 1790–1795, before that it was a filial church of the Biržai Parish. The Panevėžys Evangelical Lutheran Church was built in 1845–1850. The church was significantly damaged following the Soviet occupation of Lithuania as the building was nationalized, its tower was demolished and it was converted into a dance club, later – a household goods store. Following the Re-Establishment of the State of Lithuania, the parish and the church were restored.

During the interwar years of the independent state of Lithuania, Panevėžys region became the main residence of the Crimean Karaites. On 3 May 1922, the board for the management of the affairs of the Panevėžys Karaite community was registered. The only houses of worship in the times of interwar Lithuania were in Panevėžys and the Karaites studied in Lithuanian schools. In November 1938, with the help of the Ministry of Education, a kenesa building was built in Panevėžys and celebrations were held. A Karaite priest, a chazanas from Trakai, came to those celebrations along with the Karaites from all over Lithuania. The Karaites of Panevėžys actively participated in the Lithuanian Wars of Independence, and later served in the Lithuanian Armed Forces. Panevėžys became a center of Karaite culture and in 1934, 1936, 1939 the Karaites published three issues of  journal; the 1939 edition of the journal had 40 pages and included Maironis' poem, translated into the Karaim language, about the Trakai Island Castle. Also, the houses of the Karaite community were popular in Panevėžys. However, during the Soviet period the Panevėžys Kenesa was closed and later demolished. Currently, there is a small, but active Karaite community in Panevėžys.

Culture

The Museum of Ethnography has accumulated a lot of artifacts of historical and cultural heritage. The Art Gallery organizes about 20 different exhibitions every year as well as music and literature evenings, lectures and discussions about culture and art research. The Photography Gallery arranges 30 exhibitions of photography every year. 10 photo artists had personal exhibitions abroad and won international awards. The Public Library has 8 branches.

Since 1989 Panevėžys has been organizing International Ceramics Symposia. The unique collection of ceramics is the biggest in the Baltic countries and is added to each year. The Chamber orchestra, Women's Choir "Golden Oriole", ensemble "Muzika" are well known for various music projects not only in Lithuania but also abroad. The Brass Orchestra "Panevėžio Garsas" (English: Panevėžys Sound) plays not only for Lithuanian audience but also for people in the Baltic countries, Germany, France and the Netherlands. The Orchestra won the Grand Prize in a festival in France in 1997.

The city is a home to many theaters. Juozas Miltinis Drama Theatre is famous in Lithuania and Europe. Juozas Miltinis has brought up a number of actors. One of them is Donatas Banionis who is known internationally. Theater "Menas" (English: art) was established in 1991. The city boasts of Puppet Wagon Theater which is the only in Europe. Antanas Markuckis, the director of the Theater was awarded International Prize of Hans Christian Andersen in Copenhagen in 2003. Every two years the theater organizes the International Theater Festival "Lagaminas" (English: suitcase). There also is a musical theater and school called Juozas Miltinis school where drama lessons are lectured.

Sport

FK Ekranas, winners of the Lithuanian Football League in 2008, 2009, 2010, 2011 and 2012, was based in the town before it went bankrupt in 2015. After FK Ekranas bankruptcy the strongest football club is FK Panevėžys which is playing in Lithuanian top division A Lyga.
BC Lietkabelis, one of the clubs that established LKL and is playing in it since its inception, is also based in Panevėžys.

Panevėžys City Municipality
Panevėžys, situated in the centre of Aukštaitija, is sometimes called the capital of the region. It is a municipality on itself (Panevėžys City Municipality) and is also the capital of Panevėžys District Municipality, and Panevėžys County. The coat of arms with the red gate was adopted and formally approved in 1993.

Transportation 

During the interwar period, Panevėžys was one of the leading Lithuanian cities in streets management: there were only two first-tier cities in Lithuania with more paved streets than unpaved ones – Panevėžys and Vilkaviškis. However, Panevėžys, being larger, had significantly more paved streets. Sidewalks were also being built along the streets. Initially, the streets were paved with plain stones, but in the 1930s the central streets were already paved with hewn stones. In 1935 out of 40 kilometers of city's streets in total of 26 kilometers were paved. Country roads were also were being paved: to Berčiūnai (5.4 km; 1933–1934) and Velžys, towards Ukmergė (3.6 km; 1935). Unfortunately, none of these pavements in Panevėžys has survived to this day as during the Soviet era, all paved streets were covered with asphalt.

"Panevėžio autobusų parkas" Ltd. is serving 16 Panevėžys city routes with 44 buses running. Network is equipped with 223 passengers' bus stops.
City bus schedules

Climate

Notable residents
see also: Famous Jewish natives of Ponevezh
 Darius Grigalionis – backstroke swimmer
 Donatas Banionis – film and theater actor
 Joseph-Shlomo Mil (John Mil) (1870–1952) one of the founders of the Jewish Labour Bund, born in Panevėžys
 Juozas Miltinis – theater director
 Simas Skinderis - football player
 Mindaugas Lukauskis - basketball player
 Ignatas Konovalovas - professional cyclist
 Yosef Shlomo Kahaneman
 Benjamin Zuskin - famous Russian stage and movie actor, murdered 1952 upon Stalin's orders; see Night of the Murdered Poets
 Danas Rapšys - swimmer
 Radži - singer

Twin towns – sister cities

Panevėžys is twinned with:

 Daugavpils, Latvia
 Gabrovo, Bulgaria
 Goes, Netherlands
 Kalmar, Sweden
 Kolding, Denmark
 Lublin, Poland
 Lünen, Germany
 Maramures, Romania
 Rakvere, Estonia
 Székesfehérvár, Hungary 
 Rustavi, Georgia
 Toyohashi, Japan
 Vinnytsia, Ukraine

The city was previously twinned with:
 Kaliningrad, Russia
 Mytishchi, Russia
 Vitebsk, Belarus

Significant depictions in popular culture
 Panevėžys is one of the starting towns of Lithuania in the turn-based strategy game Medieval II: Total War: Kingdoms.

See also
 Bnei Brak
 Ponevezh yeshiva

References

Sources
  Istorija (History). City of Panevėžys. Panevėžys.lt

External links 

 Official city page
 Jews in Panevėžys before the Shoah Joseph Rosin, Panevėžys (Ponevezh)
 The murder of the Jews of Panevėžys during World War II, at Yad Vashem website.
 Panevėžys Live Webcam View (WebCam), balticlivecam.com

 
Cities in Lithuania
Cities in Panevėžys County
Capitals of Lithuanian counties
Municipalities administrative centres of Lithuania
Trakai Voivodeship
Ponevezhsky Uyezd
Holocaust locations in Lithuania
Municipalities of Panevėžys County